Eduard Kingsepp (4 March 1899 – 7 March 1929, in Tallinn) was an Estonian politician. He was a member of II Riigikogu. He was a member of the Riigikogu since 22 March 1924. He replaced Jaan Tagel. On 25 April 1924, he resigned his position and he was replaced by Aleksander Liiber.

References

1899 births
1929 deaths
Workers' United Front politicians
Members of the Riigikogu, 1923–1926